Katorz is the eleventh studio album and fourteenth release overall by the Canadian heavy metal band Voivod, released on July 25, 2006.

Demos for the album had been made, but before the band could properly begin recording it guitarist Denis D'Amour (a.k.a. Piggy) died on August 25, 2005 due to colon cancer. The guitar and bass tracks for Katorz had been recorded by D'Amour and bassist Jason Newsted (formerly of Metallica) on D'Amour's Mac at Newsted's house in California. When D'Amour would send the band a Pro Tools CD of the demos, he wrote "Katorz" on it, a phonetic spelling of "quatorze", the French word for fourteen. After D'Amour's death, Langevin and Bélanger recorded their drum and vocal tracks, respectively, to be added to those existing tracks. The song, "The X-Stream", is included in the videogame Guitar Hero II.

Track listing

Personnel
Voivod
Denis Bélanger a.k.a. Snake - vocals
Denis D'Amour a.k.a. Piggy - guitar, interludes
Jason Newsted a.k.a. Jasonic - bass guitar, backing vocals
Michel Langevin a.k.a. Away - drums, interludes, artwork

Additional musicians
Ramachandra Borcar - interludes

Production
Glen Robinson - producer, mixing with Voivod
Dominique Lejeune, Olivier Ouimet - assistant engineers
Howie Weinberg - mastering at Masterdisk, New York

References 

2006 albums
Voivod (band) albums
The End Records albums
Nuclear Blast albums
Victor Entertainment albums